Clavulina gracilis is a species of coral fungus in the family Clavulinaceae. It was described by E.J.H. Corner in 1950.

References

External links

Fungi described in 1950
Fungi of Asia
gracilis